Arboreol is an epoxylignan.

Arboreol can be transformed by acid catalysis into gmelanone.

References

External links 

Lignans
Benzodioxoles